Sulfamic acid, also known as amidosulfonic acid, amidosulfuric acid, aminosulfonic acid, sulphamic acid and sulfamidic acid, is a molecular compound with the formula H3NSO3. This colourless, water-soluble compound finds many applications.  Sulfamic acid melts at 205 °C before decomposing at higher temperatures to water, sulfur trioxide, sulfur dioxide and nitrogen.

Sulfamic acid (H3NSO3) may be considered an intermediate compound between sulfuric acid (H2SO4), and sulfamide (H4N2SO2), effectively replacing a hydroxyl (–OH) group with an amine (–NH2) group at each step. This pattern can extend no further in either direction without breaking down the sulfonyl (–SO2–) moiety.  Sulfamates are derivatives of sulfamic acid.

Production
Sulfamic acid is produced industrially by treating urea with a mixture of sulfur trioxide and sulfuric acid (or oleum). The conversion is conducted in two stages, the first being sulfamation:
OC(NH2)2  +  SO3   →   OC(NH2)(NHSO3H)
OC(NH2)(NHSO3H)  +  H2SO4   →   CO2  +  2 H3NSO3

In this way, approximately 96,000 tonnes were produced in 1995.

Structure and reactivity

The compound is well described by the formula H3NSO3, not the tautomer H2NSO2(OH). The relevant bond distances are 1.44 Å for the S=O and 1.77 Å for the S–N. The greater length of the S–N is consistent with a single bond. Furthermore, a neutron diffraction study located the hydrogen atoms, all three of which are 1.03 Å distant from the nitrogen. In the solid state, the molecule of sulfamic acid is well described by a zwitterionic form.

Hydrolysis
The crystalline solid is indefinitely stable under ordinary storage conditions, however, aqueous solutions of sulfamic acid slowly hydrolyse to ammonium bisulfate, according to the following reaction:

H3NSO3 + H2O → [NH4]+[HSO4]−

Its behaviour resembles that of urea, (H2N)2CO. Both feature amino groups linked to electron-withdrawing centres that can participate in delocalised bonding. Both liberate ammonia upon heating in water, with urea releasing CO2 while sulfamic acid releases sulfuric acid.

Acid–base reactions
Sulfamic acid is a moderately strong acid, Ka = 0.101 (pKa = 0.995). Because the solid is not hygroscopic, it is used as a standard in acidimetry (quantitative assays of acid content).

H3NSO3 + NaOH → NaH2NSO3 + H2O

Double deprotonation can be effected in ammonia solution to give the anion .

H3NSO3 + 2 NH3 →  + 2

Reaction with nitric and nitrous acids
With nitrous acid, sulfamic acid reacts to give nitrogen:
HNO2 + H3NSO3 → H2SO4 + N2 + H2O
while with nitric acid, it affords nitrous oxide:
HNO3 + H3NSO3 → H2SO4 + N2O + H2O

Reaction with hypochlorite
The reaction of excess hypochlorite ions with sulfamic acid or a sulfamate salt gives rise reversibly to both N-chlorosulfamate and N,N-dichlorosulfamate ions.

HClO + H2NSO3H → ClNHSO3H + H2O
HClO + ClNHSO3H  Cl2NSO3H + H2O

Consequently, sulfamic acid is used as hypochlorite scavenger in the oxidation of aldehydes with chlorite such as the Pinnick oxidation.

Reaction with alcohols
Upon heating sulfamic acid will react with alcohols to form the corresponding organosulfates. It is more expensive than other reagents for doing this, such as chlorosulfonic acid or oleum, but is also significantly milder and will not sulfonate aromatic rings. Products are produced as their ammonium salts. Such reactions can be catalyzed by the presence of urea. Without the presence of any catalysts, sulfamic acid will not react with ethanol at temperatures below 100 °C.

ROH + H2NSO3H → ROS(O)2O− + 

An example of this reaction is the production 2-ethylhexyl sulfate, a wetting agent used in the mercerisation of cotton, by combining sulfamic acid with 2-ethylhexanol.

Applications
Sulfamic acid is mainly a precursor to sweet-tasting compounds. Reaction with cyclohexylamine followed by addition of NaOH gives C6H11NHSO3Na, sodium cyclamate. Related compounds are also sweeteners, such as acesulfame potassium.

Sulfamates have been used in the design of many types of therapeutic agents such as antibiotics, nucleoside/nucleotide human immunodeficiency virus (HIV) reverse transcriptase inhibitors, HIV protease inhibitors (PIs), anticancer drugs (steroid sulfatase and carbonic anhydrase inhibitors), anti-epileptic drugs, and weight loss drugs.

Cleaning agent
Sulfamic acid is used as an acidic cleaning agent and descaling agent sometimes pure or as a component of proprietary mixtures, typically for metals and ceramics. For cleaning purposes, there are different grades based on application such as GP Grade, SR Grade and TM Grade. It is frequently used for removing rust and limescale, replacing the more volatile and irritating hydrochloric acid, which is cheaper.  It is often a component of household descalant, for example, Lime-A-Way Thick Gel contains up to 8% sulfamic acid and has pH 2.0–2.2, or detergents used for removal of limescale. When compared to most of the common strong mineral acids, sulfamic acid has desirable water descaling properties, low volatility, and low toxicity.  It forms water-soluble salts of calcium and ferric iron.

Sulfamic acid is preferable to hydrochloric acid in household use, due to its intrinsic safety. If inadvertently mixed with hypochlorite based products such as bleach, it does not form chlorine gas, whereas the most common acids would; the reaction (neutralisation) with ammonia, produces a salt, as depicted in the section above.

It also finds applications in the industrial cleaning of dairy and brewhouse equipment. Although it is considered less corrosive than hydrochloric acid, corrosion inhibitors are often added to the commercial cleansers of which it is a component. It can be used as a descalant for descaling home coffee and espresso machines and in denture cleaners.

Other uses
 Catalyst for esterification process
 Dye and pigment manufacturing
 Herbicide
 Descalant for scale removal
 Coagulator for urea-formaldehyde resins
 Ingredient in fire extinguishing media. Sulfamic acid is the main raw material for ammonium sulfamate which is a widely used herbicide and fire retardant material for household products.
 Pulp and paper industry as a chloride stabilizer
 Synthesis of nitrous oxide by reaction with nitric acid
 The deprotonated form (sulfamate) is a common counterion for nickel(II) in electroplating.
Used to separate nitrite ions from mixture of nitrite and nitrate ions( NO3−+ NO2−) during qualitative analysis of nitrate by Brown Ring test.
 Obtaining deep eutectic solvents with urea

Silver polishing
According to the label on the consumer product, the silver cleaning product TarnX contains thiourea, a detergent, and sulfamic acid.

References

Further reading
 
 
 

Hydrogen compounds
Sulfur oxoacids
Household chemicals
Cleaning product components
Sulfamates